

Qualification
A total of 176 gymnasts are allowed to compete (114 in artistic, 46 in rhythmic and 16 in trampoline). A nation may enter a maximum of 22 athletes across all disciplines (five in each gender for artistic, six athletes in rhythmic group, two in individual and two in each trampoline event).

Qualification timeline

Qualification summary
*In Artistic Gymnastics, NOCs with 5 entered gymnasts may also enter the team competition.

Artistic
The top eight teams in each event qualified five gymnasts each. Teams 9-13 each qualified two gymnasts each. A further seven spots were available (per gender) for individual qualification (with a maximum of one quota per gender per nation). However, only 12 nations entered the men's team event. This meant that the two additional quotas were allocated to the individual qualification (bringing the total to nine available spots). However, only eight nations had entered the individual event and thus the ninth-place finishing team received an additional quota (three total). In the women's event only eleven nations entered the team event which mean an additional four quotas were available in the individual event. However, only ten nations were entered in that event, meaning the ninth place team also got three spots.

Men

Costa Rica qualified two men, but declined one spot, which was awarded to Venezuela.

Women

Rhythmic
The top six nations in the individual event at the Pan American Championship qualified two gymnasts. The last four spots went to the top four nations in the individual event, that have not earned any quotas. The top five nations in the group event also qualified.

Individual

Group

Trampoline
The top two teams in the team event at the Pan American Championship qualified two gymnasts in each respective event. The last four spots in each event went to the top two nations in the individual event, that have not earned any quotas.

References

External links
Pan American Championship Results

P
Qualification for the 2015 Pan American Games
Gymnastics at the 2015 Pan American Games